This is a list of Members of Parliament (MPs) in the second half of the Long Parliament which began in the reign of King Charles I and continued into the Commonwealth.

The fifth and last Parliament of Charles I began at Westminster 3 November 1640 and continued sitting until 20 April 1653, when it was dissolved. By 1645, a considerable proportion of the house had been removed, being expelled for various reasons, disabled for supporting the King, killed in the Civil War or lost through natural causes. Their seats were left vacant for several years and were filled by new elections after around 1645, so that new MPs supplemented those that had survived since 1640.

In December 1648, the army imposed its will on parliament and large numbers of MPs were excluded under Pride's Purge, creating the Rump Parliament. Many who were not officially excluded did not participate in the affairs of the house. Although the parliament was dissolved in 1653 and four intervening parliaments were called, the Long Parliament was reconvened in 1659 for another dissolution.

This list contains details of the MPs in the house after 1645. For the original membership of the House of Commons in 1640 see List of MPs elected to the English parliament in 1640 (November).  There is also a list of MPs not excluded from the English parliament in 1648.

List of constituencies and MPs

See also
Long Parliament

References
D. Brunton & D. H. Pennington, Members of the Long Parliament (London: George Allen & Unwin, 1954)
Cobbett's Parliamentary history of England, from the Norman Conquest in 1066 to the year 1803 (London: Thomas Hansard, 1808)
 
The parliamentary or constitutional history of England;: being a faithful account of all the most remarkable transactions in Parliament, from the earliest times. Collected from the journals of both Houses, the records, ..., Volume 9

1645